Missio Seminary is an interdenominational Evangelical Christian seminary in Philadelphia, Pennsylvania. The seminary was previously known as Biblical Theological Seminary but changed to its current name in 2018. It is located on the site of Franklin Music Hall, formerly the Electric Factory.

History

Missio Seminary was founded in 1971 as the Biblical School of Theology by Jack W. Murray, president of Bible Evangelism, Inc., and founder of the now-closed Clearwater Christian College, and Allan A. MacRae, a former president of Faith Theological Seminary, who served as the seminary's first president.  The former E.B. Laudenslager public school in Hatfield, Pennsylvania, was renovated to house the new school. In 1978 the name was changed to Biblical Theological Seminary.

Frank A. James III was inaugurated as Biblical's fourth president in 2013. James previously served as provost of Gordon-Conwell Theological Seminary and president of Reformed Theological Seminary.

Academics
The seminary received regional accreditation from the Middle States Association of Colleges and Schools in 1990 and from the Association of Theological Schools in the United States and Canada in 1996.

The seminary offers the Master of Arts (MA), Master of Divinity (M.Div.), Master of Theology (Th.M.), and Doctor of Ministry (D.Min.) degrees. Certificate programs are also offered, as well as online courses.

In addition to the school's regular full-time and part-time faculty, various prominent scholars have served as visiting professors or adjunct faculty, including Scot McKnight, D. A. Carson, Timothy Keller, and Peter Enns.

Notable alumni
 Paul C. H. Lim, Professor of Vanderbilt University

References

External links

Seminaries and theological colleges in Pennsylvania
Educational institutions established in 1971
Interdenominational seminaries and theological colleges
Missional Christianity
Universities and colleges in Montgomery County, Pennsylvania